The spiny frog is a frog native to Hainan, southern China.

Spiny frog may also refer to:

 Blanford's spiny frog, a frog found in China, India, Nepal, and possibly Bhutan
 Boulenger's spiny frog, a frog found in China and Vietnam
 Cona spiny frog, a frog found in China and Bhutan
 Giant spiny frog, a frog found in China
 Hong Kong spiny frog, a frog found in southern China
 Jiulong spiny frog, a frog endemic to eastern China
 Medog spiny frog, a frog endemic to Tibet, China
 Ocellated spiny frog, a frog found in China and Myanmar
 Piebald spiny frog, a frog endemic to Yunnan, China
 Polunin's spiny frog, a frog found in China, India, and Nepal
 Spiny Cochran frog, a frog found in Colombia, Costa Rica, Ecuador, Honduras, Panama, and Nicaragua
 Spiny giant frog, a frog found in the Dominican Republic and Haiti
 Spiny reed frog, a frog found in Africa
 Spiny tree frog, a frog endemic to the Philippines
 Spiny tree frog (Papua New Guinea), a frog endemic to Papua New Guinea
 Yunnan spiny frog, found in China, Vietnam, Myanmar, and possibly Laos

Animal common name disambiguation pages